Penicillium olsonii is an anamorph, filamentous species in the genus Penicillium which produces several polygalacturonases, xanthoepocin, asperphenamate, verrucolone, phthalate and olnacin. Penicillium olsonii is an often source of spoilage of tomatoes, salami and beans This species occurs ubiquitously in soil

Further reading

References 

olsonii
Fungi described in 1912